The 1940 United States presidential election in Louisiana took place on November 5, 1940, as part of the 1940 United States presidential election. State voters chose ten representatives, or electors, to the Electoral College, who voted for president and vice president.

Louisiana was won by incumbent President Franklin D. Roosevelt (D–New York), running with Secretary Henry A. Wallace, with 85.88% of the popular vote, against Wendell Willkie (R–New York), running with Minority Leader Charles L. McNary, with 14.09% of the popular vote.

By percentage of the vote carried, Louisiana was the third-most lopsided contest in the nation, only behind South Carolina and Mississippi, whose margins both exceeded 90% in favor of Roosevelt.

Results

Results by parish

See also
 United States presidential elections in Louisiana

References

Louisiana
1940
1940 Louisiana elections